The Los Cabos Corridor (Corredor Turistico) is a tourist area located at the Los Cabos Municipality, Baja California Sur, Mexico. It sits on the southern coast of the Baja California Peninsula, facing the Gulf of California on the Transpeninsular Highway between San José del Cabo and Cabo San Lucas. It stretches about  along the highway and addresses within this area are usually specified in terms of distances from the start of Highway 1. The corridor is a popular tourist destination due to its many beach resorts, golf courses, and sport fishing.

Notable events
 Hurricane Marty made landfall at San José del Cabo on September 22, 2003.
 The Sheraton Hacienda del Mar was the host of the 14th annual meeting of APEC, held in October 2002.
 Part of the movie Troy (2004) was filmed at Playa El Faro Viejo.

Cabo San Lucas beaches
Lovers' Beach is unusual in that it opens to two seas: the Pacific side is known as "Divorce Beach."

See also

 List of companies of Mexico
 List of hotels in Mexico

References

Los Cabos Municipality (Baja California Sur)
Seaside resorts in Mexico
Hotels in Mexico
Beaches of Baja California Sur